Fischelbach is a town subdivision of Bad Laasphe in the Siegen-Wittgenstein district in North Rhine-Westphalia, Germany with 630 inhabitants (2011).

Geography 
Fischelbach lies in the southern part of the modern Kreis (district) of Siegen-Wittgenstein, 8 km away of Bad Laasphe.

References

External links

Villages in North Rhine-Westphalia